In geometry, a disk (also spelled disc) is the region in a plane bounded by a circle. A disk is said to be closed if it contains the circle that constitutes its boundary, and open if it does not.

Formulas
In Cartesian coordinates, the open disk of center  and radius R is given by the formula

while the closed disk of the same center and radius is given by 

The area of a closed or open disk of radius R is πR2 (see area of a disk).

Properties
The disk has circular symmetry.

The open disk and the closed disk are not topologically equivalent (that is, they are not homeomorphic), as they have different topological properties from each other. For instance, every closed disk is compact whereas every open disk is not compact. However from the viewpoint of algebraic topology they share many properties: both of them are contractible and so are homotopy equivalent to a single point. This implies that their fundamental groups are trivial, and all homology groups are trivial except the 0th one, which is isomorphic to Z. The Euler characteristic of a point (and therefore also that of a closed or open disk) is 1.

Every continuous map from the closed disk to itself has at least one fixed point (we don't require the map to be bijective or even surjective); this is the case n=2 of the Brouwer fixed point theorem. The statement is false for the open disk: 

Consider for example the function

which maps every point of the open unit disk to another point on the open unit disk to the right of the given one. But for the closed unit disk it fixes every point on the half circle

As a statistical distribution
A uniform distribution on a unit circular disk is occasionally encountered in statistics. It most commonly occurs in operations research in the mathematics of urban planning, where it may be used to model a population within a city. Other uses may take advantage of the fact that it is a distribution for which it is easy to compute the probability that a given set of linear inequalities will be satisfied. (Gaussian distributions in the plane require numerical quadrature.)

"An ingenious argument via elementary functions" shows the mean Euclidean distance between two points in the disk to be , while direct integration in polar coordinates shows the mean squared distance to be .

If we are given an arbitrary location at a distance  from the center of the disk, it is also of interest to determine the average distance  from points in the distribution to this location and the average square of such distances.

Average distance to an arbitrary internal point

The steps needed to evaluate the integral, together with several references, will be found in the paper by Lew et al.; the result is that

Average distance to an arbitrary external point
Turning to an external location, we can set up the integral in a similar way, this time obtaining

Hence

We may substitute  to get 

using standard integrals.

Hence again , while also

See also
Unit disk, a disk with radius one
Annulus (mathematics), the region between two concentric circles
Ball (mathematics), the usual term for the 3-dimensional analogue of a disk
Disk algebra, a space of functions on a disk
Disk segment
Orthocentroidal disk, containing certain centers of a triangle

References

Euclidean geometry
Circles
Planar surfaces